Claudia Barrett (born Imagene Williams; November 3, 1929 – April 30, 2021) was an American television and film actress.

Early life
Barrett was born in Los Angeles, California, the daughter of Mr. and Mrs. I. J. Williams. She began taking acting classes at an early age to overcome her timidness. After high school, she studied at Pasadena Community Playhouse for a year and acted at Encino Little Theatre.

Career
Although she was mainly involved with television, Barrett's acting career began with film in the late 1940s and 1950s. At age 18, she was signed (as Imagene Williams) to a contract with Warner Bros. Her first movie appearance was in the 1949 classic film noir White Heat starring James Cagney and Virginia Mayo. The next year, she had the part of Miss Dolly Travers in MGM's The Happy Years, which starred Dean Stockwell, Darryl Hickman, and Leo G. Carroll. After leaving Warner Bros., she appeared in several films at Republic Pictures, a studio that for the most part produced Westerns. Her other film credits included The Story of Seabiscuit and Chain Lightning, as well as one of the leads of A Life at Stake, a murder drama starring Angela Lansbury. In 1953, she played one of the lead roles, Alice, in the low-budget science-fiction film Robot Monster, generally regarded as one of the worst films of all time. She had accepted the part against the advice of her agent. She said the following about her role:

Barrett appeared in numerous television shows, including The Abbott and Costello Show, The Lone Ranger, 77 Sunset Strip, and The Jack Benny Program. Barrett retired from acting in 1964 but stayed in show business, working for the Academy of Motion Picture Arts and Sciences.

Personal life
Barrett was married to actor Alan Wells between 1953 and 1956. Wells later married actress Barbara Lang, but on June 5, 1957, Lang sought an annulment, alleging that Wells had not received a final divorce from Barrett when he and Lang married.

Barrett died of natural causes at her home in Palm Desert, California on April 30, 2021 at the age of 91.

Filmography

References

External links

1929 births
2021 deaths
American film actresses
American television actresses
Actresses from Los Angeles
Warner Bros. contract players
20th-century American actresses
People from Sherman Oaks, Los Angeles
21st-century American women